Courtney Lee Cameron (born 3 January 1993) is an English professional footballer who plays for Coventry United as a midfielder. Cameron began his career at Aston Villa.

Career

Born in Northampton, Cameron played for Northampton Town as a schoolboy before moving on to Aston Villa's academy in June 2009 for a fee of £35,000. Since at Aston Villa, Cameron have since rise from youth team to become a regular in the Premier League club's reserve side.

On 16 November 2012, Cameron signed a six-week loan deal with Rotherham United. He made his debut the following day, in a 4–2 victory over against Cheltenham Town at the New York Stadium. He scored his first goal for the club on 1 January 2013, scoring a late goal in a 2–1 win against Rochdale.

At the end of 2012–13 season, Cameron was released after four years at the club. Cameron signed a two-year contract for Torquay United on 8 July 2013.

Courtney Cameron joined Coventry United during the 2016/17 season, competing in the Midland League Premier Division.

Career statistics

References

External links

Living people
1993 births
Footballers from Northampton
English footballers
Association football midfielders
Aston Villa F.C. players
Rotherham United F.C. players
Torquay United F.C. players
Southport F.C. players
Brackley Town F.C. players
English Football League players